Kirill Yuryevich Lavrov (15 September 1925 – 27 April 2007) was a Soviet and Russian film and theater actor and director.

Biography

Childhood
Kirill Yuryevich Lavrov was born on 15 September 1925, in Leningrad, USSR (now St. Petersburg, Russia). He was baptized by the Russian Orthodox Church of St. John the Divine in Lavrushinskoe Podvorie Monastery in Leningrad. Young Kirill Lavrov was brought up in Leningrad, in a family with deep roots in St. Petersburg society. He was fond of literature and theater from a young age, and was exposed to a highly stimulating intellectual environment in his family. He was also a good sportsman: he took gymnastics, fencing, and was a member of the youth football (soccer) team at "Spartak" sports club in Leningrad.

War
During World War II Kirill Lavrov was evacuated to Kirov, then to Novosibirsk in Siberia. There he worked as a metal worker at a military-industrial plant. In the beginning of 1943, then 17-year-old Lavrov applied to join the Red Army to fight the Nazis. He was sent for training to Astrakhan at Technical School of Aviation, from which he graduated in 1945. Then he served as an aircraft technician in the Air Force, he was stationed at an Air Force Base on the Kuril island of Iturup until 1950. There he was also involved in acting with an amateur troupe at a local army club. In 1950 he was discharged from the Red Army and reunited with his parents in Kyiv, Ukraine.

Film career
In 1955, Kirill Lavrov made his film debut in Vasyok Trubachyov and His Comrades, directed by Ilya Frez. In 1964, Lavrov shot to fame with his leading role as Sintsov in The Alive and the Dead, a war drama by director Aleksandr Stolper. Kirill Lavrov received international acclaim for the leading role as Ivan Karamazov in an Oscar-nominated film The Brothers Karamazov (1969), which he also directed together with his co-star, Mikhail Ulyanov, after the death of the original film director Ivan Pyryev. Among Lavrov's other achievements were his roles in such films as Tchaikovsky (1969), Taming of the Fire (1972), and Trust (1976).

Filmography

Actor

1929: Tretya molodost as (uncredited)
1955: Zvyozdy na krylyakh as Aviation Student (uncredited)
1955: Vasyok Trubachyov and His Comrades
1956: Maksim Perepelitsa as Army Photojournalist (uncredited)
1956: The Quarrel in Lukashi
1958: Andreyka as Viktor Zvonkov
1958: V dni oktyabrya as Vasya
1959: Ssora v Lukashakh
1960: Povest o molodozhyonakh
1960: Domoy
1961: Devchonka, s kotoroy ya druzhil as Grigori Streltsov
1963: Ulitsa Nyutona, dom 1 as Timifey Suvernev (voice)
1964: The Alive and the Dead as Ivan Sintsov
1965: Verte mne, lyudi as Aleksey Vasilyevich Lapin - Kornev
1966: A Long Happy Life as Victor
1967: Shtrikhi k portretu
1969: The Brothers Karamazov as Ivan
1969: Vozmezdie as Ivan Sinzov
1969: Nashi znakomyye as Leonid Skvortsov
1969: Pravdu! Nichego, krome pravdy! as Narrator
1969: Neitralnye vody
1970: Tchaikovsky as Władysław Pachulski
1970: Lyubov Yarovaya as Fyodor Shvandya
1972: Taming of the Fire as Andrei Bashkirtsev
1972: Khod beloy korolevy as Stepan Chudinov, trener
1974: Ocean as Admiral Minichyov
1975: Eshchyo ne vecher as Andrey Pavlov
1976: Povest o chelovecheskom serdtse as Oleg Somov
1976: Trust as Lenin
1977: A Declaration of Love as Gladishev
1978: Obratnaya svyaz as Vladimir Borisovich Okunev
1978: A Hunting Accident as Count Karneyev
1978: Obyasneniye v lyubvi as Gladishev
1979: Yaroslavna, koroleva Frantsii
1979: A Glass of Water (TV Movie) as Henry St. John, Viscount Bolingbroke
1980: Puteshestvie v drugoy gorod as Sergey Kirillov
1981: 20 December as Wlodziemierz Lenin
1981: Na Granatovykh ostrovakh
1982: Journey to Another Town
1982: Karakumy, 45 v teni
1983: Highway as Urzhumov
1983: From the Life of a Chief of the Criminal Police as Col. Malych Ivan Konstantinovich
1983: Probuzhdenie
1983: Ekho dalnego vzryva
1984: Preferans po Pyatnitsam
1985: Taynaya progulka as Valeri Stepanovich
1985: Tri protsenta riska
1985: S yubileem podozhdem
1986: Red Arrow as CEO Valeri Petrovich Kropotov
1988: Bread is a proper noun (aka.. Khleb - Imya suschestvitelnoe) as Communist Shabatin
1988: Zapretnaya zona
1990: Blagorodnyy razboynik Vladimir Dubrovskiy
1991: Shkura
1991: Ischade ada as Governor
1997: Schizophrenia
2000: Tender Age
2000: Uboynaya sila (TV Series)
2005: The Master and Margarita (TV Mini-Series) as Pontius Pilate
2009: Attack on Leningrad as Radio host (final film role)

Stage works
 Ocean
 Uncle Vanya
 The Three Sisters
 Boris Godunov
 And Quiet Flows The Don
 Before Sunset
 The Quartet

Honours and awards
 Order of Merit for the Fatherland;
2nd class (2 September 2005) - for outstanding contribution to the development of theatrical art, and many years of creative activity
3rd class (13 September 2000) - for his great personal contribution to the development of theatrical art
4th class (5 August 1995) - for services to the state and many years of fruitful work in the arts and culture
 Hero of Socialist Labour (1985)
 Order of Lenin (1985)
 Order of the October Revolution (1971)
 Order of the Red Banner of Labour (1975)
 Order of the Badge of Honour (1967)
 Medals "For Victory over Germany in World War II", "Victory over Japan", "To commemorate the 30th anniversary of the Soviet Army and Navy", commemorative medals of the anniversary of Victory
 People's Artist of the USSR (1972)
 People's Artist of the RSFSR (1970)
 Honored Artist of the RSFSR (1963)
 People's Artist of Ukraine (2003)
 Lenin Prize (1982) - for his role of Lenin in the play "On reading again ..." (1980) on the stage LBADT Gorky
 USSR State Prize (1978) - a performance of "Silent Don" Mikhail Sholokhov, placed on the stage LBADT Gorky (1977)
 Vasilyev Brothers State Prize of the RSFSR (1974) - for his role Andrey Ilyitch Bashkirtseva in the movie "The Taming of the Fire" (1972) 
 Russian President's Award for Literature and the Arts (1997)
 Russian Presidential Prize "For outstanding contribution to the development of Russian cinema" (2000)
 Diploma of the Government of Russia (2000)
 Honorary citizen of St. Petersburg (1995)
 Honorary Diploma of the Legislative Assembly of Saint Petersburg (2000)
 Certificate of Merit of the President of Yakutia (2007) [10]
 Winner of Tsarskoye Selo Art Prize (2004)

References

External links
 
 
 Celebrated Russian actor Kirill Lavrov dies at 81
 Кирилл Лавров на rusactors.ru 
 Биографическая справка РИА Новости 
 Кирилл Лавров на Лентапедии 

1925 births
2007 deaths
Russian male film actors
Soviet male film actors
Male actors from Saint Petersburg
Recipients of the Order "For Merit to the Fatherland", 2nd class
Recipients of the Order "For Merit to the Fatherland", 3rd class
Recipients of the Order "For Merit to the Fatherland", 4th class
Heroes of Socialist Labour
Honored Artists of the RSFSR
People's Artists of the RSFSR
People's Artists of the USSR
Recipients of the Order of Lenin
Lenin Prize winners
Recipients of the Order of the Red Banner of Labour
Recipients of the title of People's Artists of Ukraine
Recipients of the USSR State Prize
Recipients of the Vasilyev Brothers State Prize of the RSFSR
Deaths from cancer in Russia
Deaths from leukemia
Russian male stage actors
Soviet male stage actors
Burials at Bogoslovskoe Cemetery
Soviet military personnel of World War II